Finn Hauberg Mortensen (26 July 1946 – 21 February 2013) was a Danish literature researcher and Professor of Nordic Literature at Odense University. He was the son of the artist Richard Mortensen and the author .

From 1970-1974, he taught at the University of Copenhagen; 1991-2007 he stood as professor of Nordic literature at the University of Southern Denmark; and from 2007-2012, he was head of the Department of Nordic Studies and Linguistics at the University of Copenhagen.

Mortensen wrote numerous books and articles, including biographical work of Hans Christian Andersen and Søren Kierkegaard. He was a member of the Danish Culture Canon selection committee for literature in 2006.

Publications 

 Danskfagets didaktik: Litteraturformidling i de gymnasiale uddannelser, en bevidsthedshistorisk undersøgelse (1979)
 Klingen. En antologi (1980, ed.)
 Kierkegaard 1993 - digtning, filosofi, teologi (1993)
 Kierkegaard Made in Japan (1996)
 Bibliografi over Villy Sørensens forfatterskab 1951-2001 (2003)
 Litteratur & symbol - opfattelsen af symbol- og billedsprog i dansk litterær kritik fra Rahbek til Brandes (2009)

References 

1946 births
2013 deaths
20th-century Danish non-fiction writers
21st-century Danish non-fiction writers
Danish Culture Canon committee members